Chutima Naiyana, nicknamed Ae (born August 10, 1967, in Chonburi, Thailand) is Miss Thailand 1987. She competed in the Miss Universe 1987 pageant held in Singapore. She continued working as a drama actress and musician.

References 

1967 births
Living people
Chutima Naiyana
Miss Universe 1987 contestants
Chutima Naiyana